The post of prime minister, translated as prime minister or chancellor, was an official government position established in the Chu state during the Spring and Autumn period of Chinese history (771 – 475 BCE).

King Wu of Chu (reigned 740 – 690 BCE) first established the position of prime minister which remained the most important government office in Chu until its destruction by the Qin state in 223 BCE

The post was normally given to a member of the Chu king's family and records show that only two Chu prime ministers were not related to the Chu king. They were Peng Zhongshuang, a civilian from the Shen state, at the time of King Wen of Chu (reigned 689 – 677 BCE) and the Wei general Wu Qi during the reign of King Dao of Chu (reigned 401 – 381 BCE).

List of prime ministers 
The first recorded prime minister in Chu's history was Dou Qi of Ruo'ao clan. Qi and Mo'ao(One of the three top chancellors of Chu) Qu Chong together invaded the state of Sui in 690 BCE. The following is a list of prime ministers:
 Dou Qi
 Peng Zhongshuang, originally from the state of Shen(). 
 Vacant or unknown 674 BCE-667 BCE 
 Xiong Shan, son of King Wu of Chu. also known by the title plus his courtesy name "Prime Minister Ziyuan"().
 Dou Guwutu, son of Dou Bobi,  also known by the title plus his courtesy name "Prime Minister Ziwen"().
 Cheng Decheng, also known by the title plus his courtesy name "Prime Minister Ziyu"().
 Wei Lüchen,  also known by the title plus his courtesy name "Prime Minister Zipi"().
 Dou Bo, also known by the title plus his courtesy name "Prime Minister Zishang"().
 Cheng Daxin, son of Cheng Decheng. Also known as Prime Minister Dasunbo().
 Cheng Jia, brother of Daxin. also known by the title plus his courtesy name "Prime Minister Zikong"().
 Dou Yuejiao, nephew of Dou Guwutu. also known by the title plus his courtesy name "Prime Minister Ziyue"().
 Sunshu Ao, son of Wei Jia. 
 Xiong Yingqi, son of King Mu of Chu. also known by the title plus his courtesy name "Prime Minister Zichong"().
 Xiong Renfu, brother of Yingqi. also known by the title plus his courtesy name "Prime Minister Zixing"().
 Xiong Zhen, son of King Zhuang of Chu. First recorded Shenyin before being promoted to Prime Minister. Also known by the title plus his courtesy name "Prime Minister Zinang"().
 Xiong Wu, brother of Zhen. Also known by the title plus his courtesy name "Prime Minister Zigeng"().
 Xiong Zhuishu, also known by the title plus his courtesy name "Prime Minister Zinan"().
 Wei Zifeng
 Qu Jian, also known by the title plus his courtesy name "Prime Minister Zimu".
 Xiong Wei, prince Wei. Later became King Ling of Chu.
 Wei Ba, also known by the title plus his courtesy name "Prime Minister Zidang".
 Dou Chengran, a descendant of Dou Guwutu. also known by the title plus his courtesy name "Prime Minister Ziqi".
 Yang Gai, a great grandson of King Mu of Chu.also known by the title plus his courtesy name "Prime Minister Zixia".
 Nang Wa, also known by the title plus his courtesy name "Prime Minister Zichang".
 Xiong Shen, also known by the title plus his courtesy name "Prime Minister Zixi".
 Shen Zhuliang, also known by the title plus his courtesy name "Prime Minister Zigao".
 Xiong Ning, son of Shen. Also known by the title plus his courtesy name "Prime Minister Ziguo".
 Unknown from 475 BCE to 447 BCE.
 Jing She, also known by the title plus his courtesy name "Prime Minister Zifa". 447 BCE to ?
 Unknown Prime Ministers
 Zhao Chun, Prime Minister during late 5th century BCE.
 Unknown Prime Ministers
 Wu Qi, Prime Minister between 386 BCE and  381 BCE. Originally from Wey. Murdered by Chu aristocrats on the funeral of King Dao of Chu.
 Zhouhou, Prime Minister during the reign of King Xuan of Chu.
 Zhao Xixu, Prime Minister during the reign of King Xuan of Chu.
 Xiong Qi, a prince of Chu, also known by the title plus his courtesy name "Prime Minister Zixi"().
 Zhao Yang, Prime Minister during the reign of King Wei of Chu.
 Prime Minister Zijiao. Name unknown. Prime Minister during the reign of King Huai of Chu.
 Zhao Xian
 Prime Minister Zilan, son of King Huai of Chu. Name unknown.
 Lord Chunshen, Given name Huang Xie. Prime Minister during the reign of King Kaolie of Chu.

References 

Chu (state)